The Waterman Covered Bridge was an historic covered bridge in Johnson, Vermont that carried Waterman Road across Waterman Creek.  Built in 1868, it was one of three surviving 19th-century bridges in the town.  It was listed on the National Register of Historic Places in 1974, and collapsed in January 1982.

Description and history
The Waterman Covered Bridge was located in rural southern Johnson, carrying Waterman Road, a secondary road, across Waterman Creek. It was a two-span structure, with a main span that was a queen post truss, and a secondary span of post-and-beam construction. It rested on abutments of stone and concrete, with a timber bent supporting the inner ends of the two spans. The exterior was clad in vertical board siding, which extended around to the insides of the portals. On the sides, the siding ends short of the roof, leaving an open strip. The deck consisted of wooden planking laid over steel I-beams.

The bridge was built in 1868 by a George S. Mills, and was one of three surviving 19th-century covered bridges in the town.  One of its abutments was rebuilt in concrete in 1962, and the deck reinforced with steel beams in 1969.  When it was listed on the National Register in 1974, it was described as being in deteriorating condition; it collapsed in 1982.

See also
 
 
 
 
 List of covered bridges in Vermont
 National Register of Historic Places listings in Lamoille County, Vermont
 List of bridges on the National Register of Historic Places in Vermont

References

Covered bridges on the National Register of Historic Places in Vermont
Bridges completed in 1868
Covered bridges in Lamoille County, Vermont
Demolished bridges in the United States
National Register of Historic Places in Lamoille County, Vermont
Road bridges on the National Register of Historic Places in Vermont
Buildings and structures in Johnson, Vermont
Wooden bridges in Vermont
1868 establishments in Vermont